Al-Na'ani, also called Al-Ni'ana, was a Palestinian Arab village in the Ramle Subdistrict of Mandatory Palestine. It was depopulated during the 1948 Arab–Israeli War on May 14, 1948, by the Givati Brigade during Operation Barak. It was located 6 km south of Ramle.

History
In 1838, it was noted as a  Muslim village in  Er-Ramleh district.

The village was at the site of a historic Roman site of Tel Na'na', where excavations have resulted in discovery of tombs and items dating to the Roman, Byzantine, and early Arab era.

An  Ottoman village list from about 1870 counted 92  houses and a population of 265, though  the population count included men, only.

In 1882, the PEF's Survey of Western Palestine described the place as: "A small  mud village on low ground, identified with Naamah (near Makkedah), by Captain  Warren."

British Mandate era
In the 1922 census of Palestine conducted by the British Mandate authorities, Na'ani had a population of 1,004 inhabitants; 1,002 Muslims and 2 Orthodox Christians, increasing in the 1931 census to 1,142; 1,133 Muslims and 9 Christians, in a total of 300 houses.

A British anthropologist, writing in 1932, reported that there was a group of "Sidr" trees (see Ziziphus spina-christi and Sidrat al-Muntaha) south of the village believed to be protected by spirits.

In the 1945 statistics  the village had a population of 1,470;  1,450 Muslims and 20 Christians with a total of 9,768  dunums of land.  Arabs used 335 dunums of land for plantations and irrigable land, 9,277 dunums for cereals,  while 51 dunams were classified as built-up public areas.

The Jewish kibbutz of Na'an was established in 1930, on a land purchased from Al-Na'ani. Kibbutz buildings are now on former Al-Na'ani land.

Al-Na'ani became depopulated on May 14, 1948.

1948, aftermath

In 1949 Ramot Me'ir was established on village land, west of the village site.

In 1992 the village site was described: "The site is overgrown with Christ-thorn and eucalyptus trees and a variety of wild plants. The main landmark, the railway station, is now deserted. The railway line itself is used by Israel and now extends south to Beersheba. Two deserted houses (including one belonging to Ahmad Jubayl) still remain, together with portions of houses utilized mainly for storing agricultural equipment. The land around the site is cultivated."

References

Bibliography

 
 

 

  
(p. 257)

External links
Welcome To al-Na'ani
al-Na'ani,  Zochrot
Survey of Western Palestine, Map 16:   IAA, Wikimedia commons
al-Na'ani, from the Khalil Sakakini Cultural Center

Arab villages depopulated during the 1948 Arab–Israeli War
District of Ramla
1948 disestablishments in Mandatory Palestine